Devin Copeland (born June 4, 1970), better known by his stage name Devin the Dude, is an American rapper known for his unique rapping style and his 2002 songs "Lacville '79" and "Doobie Ashtray".

Early life
Devin Copeland was born in Pontiac, Michigan on June 4, 1970. He spent most of his early childhood in St. Petersburg, Florida and moved to Houston, Texas while in the fourth grade. He spent the rest of his youth moving back and forth between New Boston and Houston, finally settling in Houston after graduating from high school. He smoked marijuana for the first time at a skating rink in seventh grade; marijuana would later become a major influence on his music. As a teenager, Copeland became interested in breakdancing, joining several dance crews until he began rapping, which soon became his main interest. After graduating from high school, he met Rob Quest, a rapper and record producer Jugg Mugg. The trio formed the group the Odd Squad.

Musical career
After forming the Odd Squad (later known as the Coughee Brothaz), the group signed to Rap-A-Lot Records. The label is notable for being the home of hip-hop artists such as Geto Boys, Scarface, and Too Much Trouble. Copeland moved on to become part of Scarface's Facemob before going solo in 1998. Copeland has released ten solo albums: The Dude (1998), Just Tryin' ta Live (2002), To tha X-Treme (2004), Waitin' to Inhale (2007), Landing Gear (2008), Suite 420 (2010), Gotta Be Me (2010), One for the Road (2013), Acoustic Levitation (2017) and Still Rollin' Up: Somethin' To Ride With (2019). He also made a number of guest appearances, including on Dr. Dre's "Fuck You" in 1999, De La Soul's "Baby Phat" in 2001, Slim Thug's "I'm Back" off of Boss of All Bosses in 2009, Gucci Mane's "Kush Is My Cologne" of off The State vs Radric Davis in 2009 alongside Bun B & E-40, Tech N9ne's "After Party" in 2010 off of The Gates Mixed Plate, and Young Jeezy's "Higher Learning" off of the late 2011 album Thug Motivation 103: Hustlerz Ambition.

In 2007, he appeared in a documentary titled Screwed In Houston produced by VBS/Vice Magazine that details the history of the Houston rap scene.

In 2008, he ended his 15-year relationship with Houston-based Rap-A-Lot Records after he decided not to renew his contract. Later that year, he signed with indie label Razor & Tie. Devin is currently being distributed by E1 Entertainment, formerly Koch. In 2012 Devin starred in the stoner comedy Highway, in which two pot smoking buddies go on a quest to find the best bud in the country on the legendary Highway 420. The soundtrack featured songs by 2 Chainz, UGK, Smoke DZA, Tha Dogg Pound, Slim Thug, Curren$y, David Banner, Asher Roth and more. On June 24, 2013 Devin announced that his eighth studio album would be titled One for the Road and be released in September 2013. It would later be confirmed for an October 8, 2013 release.

Reception

Despite being a critical success, Devin the Dude has not achieved mainstream success. The New York Times has called him "A brilliant oddball with a spaced-out flow." In addition, he has been called "Rap's best-kept secret" and "Your favorite rapper's favorite rapper".

Discography

Studio albums

Collaboration albums

Compilation albums

Extended plays

Singles

Guest appearances

References

External links
 MP3 audio interview with Devin the Dude on the radio program The Sound of Young America
 Devin the Dude Interview
 The DJBooth: Interview with Devin The Dude (Apr '07)

1970 births
Living people
African-American male rappers
Singers from Texas
Rappers from Houston
Southern hip hop musicians
Underground rappers
Songwriters from Texas
African-American songwriters
Cannabis music
21st-century American rappers
21st-century American male musicians
21st-century African-American musicians
20th-century African-American people
American male songwriters